Injustice: Gods Among Us is an American comic book series that serves as the prequel to the fighting video game of the same name. The series takes place in an alternate reality, where Superman descends into villainy following his family's death at the Joker's hands. The Justice League is split by those who put their trust in Superman, establishing the totalitarian One Earth Regime, while Batman forms an insurgency out of the other half of the League to fight back against the Regime.

The series was written by Tom Taylor and Brian Buccellato, and illustrated by a number of artists, including Jheremy Raapack, Mike S. Miller, Bruno Redondo, Tom Derenick and others. It was released digitally by DC Comics from January 2013 to September 2016, and was later released in physical comic book form and collected in trade paperback and hardcover editions.

Plot
The story is split into the six years preceding the Injustice: Gods Among Us video game. While Year Zero takes place before Year One and tells the story of how and where The Joker got the idea to drive Superman to madness, Year One to Year Four sees Superman's totalitarian regime fighting against one enemy after another. "Year Five" brings the narrative to that of the game, setting up the events that take place.

Year Zero

Year Zero features Joker using an evil mystical amulet to possess and hurt members of the Justice Society. Superman is possessed, but frees himself after Batman gets through to him. The Joker takes this as a challenge to corrupt Superman, leading to the events of Lois' death.

Year One
Year One features the Insurgency led by Batman against the Justice League led by Superman and the establishment of the One Earth Regime.

In Metropolis, a pregnant Lois Lane is kidnapped by Joker. While Superman searches for her, Batman and the Justice League deduce that Joker has used Scarecrow’s fear toxin and laced it with stolen kryptonite to affect Superman. Superman and the League track Lois to a submarine where Joker and Harley Quinn are hiding, but Superman is attacked by Doomsday. He fights and defeats Doomsday, only to learn Doomsday is an illusion and he has been fighting an unconscious Lois. Too late, he learns that Lois's heart was synced to a nuclear warhead, which detonates and destroys Metropolis when her heart stops. Blinded by grief and revenge, Superman kills Joker, despite Green Lantern’s and Batman's best efforts to stop him.

A grieving Superman decides that all violence must end, by force if necessary. He addresses the United Nations, with Wonder Woman beside him, revealing his identity as Clark Kent and demanding an immediate cessation of all worldwide hostilities. In response, the United States government contracts Mirror Master to kidnap Jonathan and Martha Kent, to use as leverage against Superman. Using increasingly draconian measures, the League locates Mirror Master and Superman relocates his parents to the Fortress of Solitude. The global escalation continues, with Wonder Woman becoming Superman's closest and most hawkish advisor as the League stops conflicts by force. Batman and Superman grow increasingly at odds, with Batman questioning Superman's and the League's unrestrained methods.

In the Pacific Ocean, the League responds to a whaling ship under attack by Aquaman at the head of an Atlantean army. Tensions boil over into a full-scale battle until Superman coerces Aquaman into backing down, but not before Atlanean armies appear on multiple coastlines as a reminder of Atlantis's power. In response, Superman lifts Atlantis and places it in the Sahara Desert. Aquaman backs down, telling Wonder Woman that he is willing to advise Superman as a fellow ruler, but she does not relay the message. In Australia, Superman and Wonder Woman violently respond to a public demonstration against the League's new tactics, crippling a fan and wannabe hero named Galaxor. The Flash, also present, begins to seriously doubt the League's new mission.

Following the destruction of Metropolis, Harley Quinn escapes police custody but is recaptured by Green Arrow. He takes her to Arkham Asylum, where Superman, Wonder Woman and Cyborg have also arrived to relocate the inmates to parts unknown. Batman and Nightwing arrive to stop them, but Robin (who believes in Superman's new crusade) switches sides to join Superman. In the ensuing fight, Robin accidentally kills Nightwing, the shock of which ends all hostilities.

At Superman's private urging, Catwoman goes to Wayne Manor to console Bruce Wayne. She and Batman secretly meet with the US President, who asks Batman to neutralize Superman. He begins building a team to oppose Superman's League—including Catwoman, Green Arrow, Aquaman, Black Canary, Black Lightning, Huntress, Captain Atom, and Batwoman. With the battle lines clearly drawn, Superman's League continues its mission of stopping conflicts by force. Shazam forces Black Adam to give up his power, but begins to doubt Superman's mission as a result.

Lex Luthor is found as the lone survivor in the ruins of Metropolis. He meets with Superman's League and wishes to join them, promising to recruit more members to Superman's side. Meanwhile, Batman's League kidnaps Hawkgirl and replaces her with the shapeshifting Martian Manhunter, thereby gaining a spy in Superman's League.

On Apokolips, Darkseid’s son Kalibak hears of Superman's new role as Earth's protector and wishes to test him. He leads a parademon invasion of Earth, coincidentally during a public relations event at which Superman and Lex Luthor hope to spread their message of public safety. Enraged, Superman pummels Kalibak to death, but not before Kalibak taunts him over his failure to save many innocent lives. Batman's and Superman's teams band together to fend off the invasion, but all appears lost until Superman uses his powers to vaporize the parademons. At a cost of thousands of lives, the invasion is stopped and Superman is more popular than ever.

In the wake of the invasion, Superman and Luthor conceive plans to create an enhanced security force, loyal only to Superman, using drugs created with Kryptonian technology. Robin teleports to Wayne Manor, having secretly taken one of the prototype drugs. He confronts Batman, with the disguised Martian Manhunter having discreetly followed him. In the ensuing fight, in which Alfred is accidentally injured, Robin deduces Martian Manhunter's true identity. In response, Superman reveals Batman's identity as Bruce Wayne, despite Batman's efforts to stop him. Superman, Wonder Woman, Green Lantern and Flash journey to the Batcave, where Wonder Woman delivers an ultimatum to Batman: stand down, or the League will respond with force. But Batman, who turns out to be a disguised Martian Manhunter, shapeshifts inside Wonder Woman. With her oxygen cut off, Wonder Woman pleads for Superman to use his heat vision on her, which he does to burn Martian Manhunter alive.

Learning that Superman's enhancement drug is being manufactured at the Fortress of Solitude, Batman's team raids the Fortress to steal it. As a distraction, US military forces engage in a build-up in the Pacific, but Superman is not long fooled by the ruse. Too late, Batman discovers Jonathan and Martha Kent at the Fortress and realizes that, if Superman discovers his team here, he will assume they have come for his parents and will respond with lethal force. Superman arrives, but Captain Atom fights him both on the orders of the Pentagon but also to give Batman's team time to get away—with the exception of Green Arrow, who is separated and trapped inside the Fortress. Wonder Woman slashes Captain Atom's suit with her sword, not realizing that this will render him unable to contain his nuclear energy. Both Superman and Wonder Woman are severely injured in the ensuing blast, but Superman recovers quickly, now realizing that the US military tried to kill him and believing that Batman's team is trying to do the same. Returning to the Fortress, he confronts Green Arrow, who is with the Kents. After Green Arrow accidentally injures Jonathan Kent with an arrow, Superman beats him to death in front of his own parents—but not before Green Arrow delivers the prototype pill to Batman. The remaining members of Batman's team escape in a costly victory. An enraged Superman confronts Batman at the Batcave, where the Batcomputer is analyzing the prototype pill. The two argue and fight, ending with Superman breaking Batman's back, but not before the analysis completes successfully, enabling Batman's Resistance to synthesize the drug. Finally Alfred, who has surreptitiously taken the drug to gain temporary superpowers, intervenes and injures Superman, allowing him to rescue Batman. In the closing, Superman's League, including Luthor, addresses the United Nations, pledging an end to violence, "Whatever the cost."

Year Two
Year Two features Superman's fight against the Green Lantern Corps and Harley Quinn joining the Insurgency.

Green Arrow’s funeral briefly brings together the rifted Justice League, but in its wake the League is more divided than ever. An injured Batman has been relocated to the Tower of Doctor Fate, outside of time and space and therefore safe from Superman. Oracle has taken charge of his resistance movement, recruiting other heroes (including Harley Quinn) to fight Superman and his supporters. Harley and Black Canary begin an odd friendship, with Harley becoming an unofficial aunt to Connor, son of Black Canary and Green Arrow. 

Meanwhile, Superman’s League continues its global crackdown under the guise of enforcing order, sending the Flash and Hal Jordan to intimidate the US Congress into averting a government shutdown. Wonder Woman remains incapacitated on Themyscira. The formation and brutal methods of Superman’s superpowered security forces, created with the help of Lex Luthor, convinces James Gordon and many members of the Gotham City Police Department to join with Batman’s resistance, thanks to Batman’s reverse-engineered superpower pills.  

En route to Earth, Green Lantern Kyle Rayner is ambushed and killed by Yellow Lanterns led by Sinestro, who joins Superman’s new regime as his new de facto advisor. The Guardians of the Universe, watching from Oa, dispatch their leader Ganthet and Green Lantern Guy Gardner to investigate the situation on Earth.

At the Fortress of Solitude, Ganthet urges Superman to step down, but negotiations fail when Ganthet admits the Guardians could have prevented Krypton’s destruction. Ganthet returns to Oa, convinced Superman must be captured and brought to Oa for trial. Hal Jordan and John Stewart, however, side with Superman and fly to Earth to warn him.

A squadron of Green Lanterns journey to Earth to arrest Superman, but are defeated with the aid of Sinestro and Yellow Lantern reinforcements. The Green Lanterns yield and, over Sinestro’s objections, are taken prisoner. Guy Gardner, covertly observing, confirms Superman’s alliance with the Sinestro Corps and warns the Guardians. In response, the Guardians dispatch all available Green Lanterns, including the sentient planet Mogo, to Earth in a final attempt to defeat Superman.

The battle rages on Earth and above it, with the Green Lanterns attacking the Sinestro Corps and Batman's resistance attacking the Hall of Justice. Luthor warns Gordon that Barbara’s identity as Oracle has been compromised, and the two teleport to the Watchtower to stop Cyborg from finding the resistance. Gordon (who is suffering from lung cancer) defeats Cyborg at the cost of his own life, but not before saying his farewell to his daughter and Bruce Wayne.

Black Canary, out for revenge for Superman’s murder of her husband Green Arrow, defeats Superman with the aid of a kryptonite bullet. The day appears won for the resistance, but Superman becomes a Yellow Lantern and, fueled by the fear he instills in everyone on Earth, is more powerful than ever. He kills Ganthet and Mogo by crashing them both into the Sun. Seeing the tide of the battle turn, Batman orders a retreat. 

Guy Gardner and John Stewart are killed in the fighting, along with at least a quarter of the Sinestro Corps, and Hal Jordan is forced to become a Yellow Lantern to save Carol Ferris. Black Canary is also seemingly killed, but rescued by Doctor Fate and taken to a different Earth where she and an alternate Oliver Queen can be together with their son. Several members of Superman’s League are prisoners of the resistance, including Flash, Cyborg and Robin. But Superman's League continues to rule Earth, and he has proven his willingness to kill on a mass scale to continue doing so.

Year Three
Year Three introduces magic users such as John Constantine, the Spectre, Deadman, Zatanna and Doctor Fate, who aid the Insurgency. Although it is revealed at the end of Year Three that Constantine was fighting for his own selfish reasons.

Year Four
Year Four introduces the Greek Gods, revealing Ares' scheme to empower himself through escalating the conflict between the Regime and the Insurgency into a war by involving his fellow gods alongside enlisting the aid of Darkseid. This leads to a confrontation between Zeus and Highfather during which the latter convinces Zeus to stop being manipulated by Ares' scheme after which the gods leave, with Zeus decreeing that they shall never return to Earth.

Year Five
Year Five sees a desperate last stand from Batman, the supervillains being freed after Plastic Man breaks into the Regime's underwater prison to free his son, and a small handful of the remaining Insurgents and Lex Luthor to establish a link to the Prime Universe Justice League and call them for help. The end of Year Five serves as the direct precursor to the game.

Ground Zero

Ground Zero is told from Harley Quinn's perspective.

Injustice 2 (comics)

The comics based on Injustice 2 take place before the events of the sequel game itself. The comics feature Batman's attempt to reform the society after the fall of the One Earth Regime, Ra's al Ghul's rise to power and his plans to save the world from ecological destruction, Hal Jordan's redemption after following Superman's Regime, and Gorilla Grodd ruling over Gorilla City.

Injustice vs. Masters of the Universe
Injustice vs. Masters of the Universe takes place after the Injustice 2's "Absolute Power" ending. The Insurgents finds He-Man in order that he might stop Superman permanently. Superman attempts to employ Skeletor to restore his family to life. He then searches the multiverse in order to find a reality where they still live, only to learn that fate will not allow them to do so in any reality. After a clash with He-Man, Superman receives a fatal blast of lightning from He-Man and Castle Greyskull (Superman having a vulnerability to magic), then, any redemptive moment with He-Man, dies. Batman forms a new Justice League in his son's honor.

Publication history
The series was announced by Ed Boon on October 5, 2012, at the EB Games Expo. The first issue was released digitally on January 15, 2013, by writer Tom Taylor and artist Jheremy Raapack, and subsequent issues were released weekly. The digital issues were later collected and issued in monthly print comic book form, and eventually in collected editions. In December 2014, Taylor announced that he would be leaving the series after writing Injustice: Gods Among Us – Year Three digital issue #14 (print issue #7), with Brian Buccellato replacing him by continuing the story into Year Four and Five. The final digital issue of the series was released on September 20, 2016, stopping right before the plot of the Injustice: Gods Among Us video game.

Sequels and spin-offs
Another comic book series, titled Injustice: Ground Zero, followed the Injustice comic prequels. This series was a retelling of the game's events from Harley Quinn's perspective.

Taylor and Bruno Redondo returned as the writer and artist respectively for the sequel comic book series Injustice 2 which began publication in May 2017. The series takes place between the events of the first game and its sequel, Injustice 2.

A miniseries known as Injustice vs. Masters of the Universe featuring a crossover with the Masters of the Universe franchise was first published on July 18, 2018, by DC Comics. It is written by Tim Seeley with art by Freddie Williams II, and follows the second game's alternate ending, where Superman wins out over Batman.

Injustice: Year Zero was released in 2020.

Reception

Critical
The series was well received by critics. According to review aggregator Comic Book Roundup, Year One as a whole scored an average of 8.6/10 based on 115 reviews, Year Two averaged 8.4/10 based on 115 reviews, Year Three averaged 8.3/10 based on 122 reviews, Year Four averaged 7.4/10 based on 77 reviews, and Year Five averaged 8.1/10 based on 134 reviews. Ground Zero scored an average of 7.6/10 based on 54 reviews, and Year Zero as a whole scored an average of 8.7/10 based on 21 reviews.

Accolades
2013 IGN People's Choice Award for Best Digital Comic Series
2014 IGN Best Digital Comic Series
2014 IGN People's Choice Award for Best Digital Comic Series

Collected editions
The Injustice: Gods Among Us series is collected in several trade paperbacks and hardcovers.

In other media

Film
The Knightmare Sequence in Batman v Superman: Dawn of Justice & Zack Snyder's Justice League takes elements from the comic book series.

An animated Injustice film was released on October 19, 2021 as part of the DC Universe Animated Original Movies line. The film is partly based on the Year One storyline in the comics.

References

DC Comics titles
Injustice (franchise)
Works based on Warner Bros. video games
2013 comics debuts
2016 comics endings